Jacobs is a brand of coffee that traces its beginnings to 1895 in Germany by  (1869 in , Bremen – 1958 in Bremen) and is today marketed in Europe by JDE Peet's.

Major markets
Major markets are Austria, the Baltic countries, North Macedonia, Finland, Bulgaria, Croatia, Bosnia and Herzegovina, Serbia, the Czech Republic, Germany, Greece, Israel, Hungary, Poland, the Netherlands,
Romania, Russia, Slovakia, Azerbaijan, Switzerland, Iran, Turkey, Tajikistan, Georgia, Ukraine, Namibia, South Africa, Tunisia, Morocco, México, The Bahamas, Ireland, Botswana and Zimbabwe.

Managements
Under the direction of Klaus Johann Jacobs, who took over the company in 1970, Jacobs expanded into other fields. It merged with the Swiss chocolate company Interfood in 1982 to form Jacobs Suchard, and bought the American Brach's Candy in 1987, among other acquisitions. Jacobs Suchard, with the exception of Brach's and Interfood, was sold to Kraft Foods in 1990. During the 1970s until 1990s it was produced by Jacob's in Ireland.

Brands

 Jacobs Krönung (marketed as Jacobs Monarch in some markets) and available in disks for the Tassimo coffee maker.
 Jacobs Night&Day
 Jacobs Cronat Gold
 Jacobs 3in1

References

External links
 

JDE Peet's
Coffee brands
German brands
Coffee in Germany